Enara López Gallastegui (born 3 July 1997) is a Spanish racing cyclist, who currently rides for UCI Women's Continental Team .

References

External links
 

1997 births
Living people
Spanish female cyclists
Place of birth missing (living people)
Sportspeople from Bilbao
Cyclists from the Basque Country (autonomous community)